Sergeant Henry F. Chandler (September 26, 1835 – November 16, 1906) was an American soldier who fought in the American Civil War. Chandler received the country's highest award for bravery during combat, the Medal of Honor, for his action during the Second Battle of Petersburg in Virginia on 17 June 1864. He was honored with the award on 30 March 1898.

Biography
Chandler was born in Andover, Massachusetts on 26 September 1835. He enlisted into the 59th Massachusetts Infantry. He died on 16 November 1906 and his remains are interred at the West Parish Garden Cemetery in Andover, Massachusetts.

Medal of Honor citation

See also

List of American Civil War Medal of Honor recipients: A–F

References

1835 births
1906 deaths
People of Massachusetts in the American Civil War
Union Army officers
United States Army Medal of Honor recipients
American Civil War recipients of the Medal of Honor